The AF DX Fisheye-Nikkor 10.5mm 2.8G ED is a fisheye lens manufactured by Nikon for use on Nikon DX format digital SLR cameras. It provides a full 180-degree angle of view on a DX format camera.

Introduction 

Nikon announced the lens on 22 July 2003. It was the first prime lens released by Nikon specifically designed for Nikon DX format DSLR cameras. The lens produces a distinctive rectangular fisheye image, which fills the DX format frame (as opposed to a circular fisheye lens which produces a circular image). The lens does not support autofocus on the D40, D40X, D60, D3000, and D5000 as it does not have a built-in focus motor.

Features 

 10.5mm focal length (approximately equivalent to a 16mm lens used on a 135 film format camera).
 Nikon F-lens mount exclusively for use with Nikon DX format DSLRs.
 Full 180-degree angle of view.
 Rectangular fisheye image.

Construction 

 10 elements in 7 groups.
 1 ED (extra low dispersion) glass element.
 Built-in hood.
 Rear gelatin filter (no front filter thread).

References

External links 
 Fisheyes – III – The AF Fisheye-Nikkor 16 mm f/2.8D, by Pierre Toscani: an inverse ray tracing study of this lens, including its mapping function and the behavior of its entrance pupil.

Nikon F-mount lenses
Fisheye lenses
Camera lenses introduced in 2003